Ptyodactylus dhofarensis is a species of gecko. It is endemic to Oman.

References

Ptyodactylus
Reptiles described in 2013